Zhou Peiyuan (August 28, 1902 – November 24, 1993) was a Chinese theoretical physicist and politician. He served as president of Peking University, and was an academician of the Chinese Academy of Sciences (CAS).

Born in Yixing, Jiangsu, China, Zhou graduated from Tsinghua University in 1924. Then he went to the United States and obtained a bachelor's degree from University of Chicago in Spring of 1926, and a master's degree at the end of the same year. In 1928, he obtained his doctorate degree from California Institute of Technology under Eric Temple Bell with thesis The Gravitational Field of a Body with Rotational Symmetry in Einstein's Theory of Gravitation. In 1936, he studied general relativity under Albert Einstein in the Institute for Advanced Study in Princeton, New Jersey. He did his post-doc researches in quantum mechanics at University of Leipzig in Germany and Swiss Federal Institute of Technology Zurich. He was a professor of physics at Peking University, and later served as the president of the University. He was elected as a founding member of CAS in 1955.

Tsinghua University's Zhou Pei-Yuan Center for Applied Mathematics is named in his honor. In 2003, a bronze statue of Zhou was unveiled on the campus of Peking University.

Zhou's most famous work is the transport equation of  Reynolds stress.

References

1902 births
1993 deaths
California Institute of Technology alumni
Educators from Wuxi
Members of the Chinese Academy of Sciences
Members of the Jiusan Society
Academic staff of Peking University
People from Yixing
Physicists from Jiangsu
Presidents of Peking University
Scientists from Wuxi
Academic staff of Tsinghua University
University of Chicago alumni
Vice Chairpersons of the National Committee of the Chinese People's Political Consultative Conference